The 2007 Champ Car World Series season was the fourth and final season of the Champ Car World Series. It began on April 8, 2007 and ended on November 11 after 14 races. Unbeknownst at the time, this would end up being the final contested season of Champ Car, as the following February, the series unified with the Indy Racing League (IRL), marking the end of the Champ Car World Series for good.

For 2007 Champ Car underwent some major changes. The opening race of the season was switched from the Grand Prix of Long Beach to Las Vegas for the first running of the Vegas Grand Prix. The Long Beach Grand Prix was the second race of the season, followed by the Grand Prix of Houston. Also, the entire schedule was held on road and street courses, and the events were timed races instead of races for a set number of laps. The full 2007 schedule was announced on Wednesday, September 27, 2006.

Champ Car officials confirmed that Panoz would be the sole chassis supplier for Champ Car for the three years beginning in 2007. The Panoz DP01 was built by sister company Élan Motorsport Technologies and was powered by a turbo-charged Cosworth engine.  The new formula was reported to significantly lower the costs of competing in the series, which was in turn expected to increase car counts for the 2007 Champ Car season. However, 2007 entries did not exceeded those of 2006.  Ford announced it would no longer badge the Cosworth engines as Ford sold Cosworth to Kevin Kalkhoven. Mazda was confirmed as the new pace car and courtesy vehicle supplier.

ESPN announced a new, multiyear agreement that marked the return of the Champ Car World Series to the network in 2007.

On January 16, 2007, Champ Car announced their return to Europe, for the first time since 2003, with races scheduled for August 26, 2007 at the historic Zolder circuit in Belgium, and September 2, 2007 at the TT Circuit Assen in the Netherlands.

On January 23, 2007, Champ Car unveiled its new logo for the Champ Car World Series and the Atlantic Series. According to its  website, it is a sleeker design with the new Panoz DP01 chassis on the right with an emphasis on a chicane-style layout, representing the street track racing that dominates Champ Car. There were no oval tracks on the calendar, with Milwaukee removed after the 2006 race.

Drivers and teams 
The following teams and drivers competed in the 2007 Champ Car World Series season. All teams used a Cosworth 2.65-litre turbocharged V8 engine, a Panoz DP01 chassis, and Bridgestone tires.

Zsolt Baumgartner & Mario Domínguez were test drivers for Minardi Team USA.

Mid-season changes
 Oriol Servià replaced Paul Tracy at Forsythe Racing for Long Beach & Houston, after Tracy injured his back in a practice accident on Saturday morning of the race weekend at Long Beach.  Servià was then signed as a permanent replacement for Mario Domínguez prior to the fourth round of the series.
 Alex Figge was unable to take part in Houston, citing back pain suffered in a crash at Long Beach. He was replaced by Champ Car veteran Roberto Moreno, making his first start in the series since 2003.
 Jan Heylen was signed initially to drive for Conquest Racing at the European rounds of the series; however, on June 1, the team confirmed that the Belgian was signed for the remainder of the season replacing Matt Halliday.
 Tristan Gommendy was unable to take part in Edmonton, suffering a couple of microscopic fractures in a practice accident on Friday of the race weekend.  He was replaced by Mario Domínguez, who was on hand to drive the Minardi two-seater Formula One cars.
 Ryan Dalziel was unable to take part in San Jose after suffering a broken collarbone while training on his bicycle.  He was replaced by Mario Domínguez.
 Dan Clarke was banned from the rest of the inaugural Belgian Champ Car Grand Prix weekend after causing a four car pile up in the first practice session at Zolder, which involved himself, Paul Tracy, Justin Wilson and hometown hero Jan Heylen. Clarke was replaced for the rest of the weekend at Minardi Team USA by Mario Domínguez.
 Champ Car Atlantic driver David Martínez replaced veteran Oriol Servià in the No. 7 Forsythe/Indeck car for the Surfers Paradise and Mexico City races.
 Mario Domínguez replaced Ryan Dalziel in the No. 28 Pacific Coast Motorsports car for the Surfers Paradise and Mexico City races.
 Nelson Philippe replaced Jan Heylen in the No. 34 Conquest Racing car for the Surfers Paradise and Mexico City races.  Philippe will be able to defend his 2006 race win at Surfers.
 Oriol Servià found a ride with PKV Racing for the Surfers Paradise race after "an unresolved business situation" prevented Tristan Gommendy from taking part.

Season summary

Schedule 
The 2007 Champ Car season ended up having 14 races, down from the proposed 17 races.

 Dedicated road course  Temporary street circuit
The Grand Prix of Denver was cancelled by Champ Car on February 1.
The Chinese Champ Car Grand Prix, after having its original May 20 date postponed, was cancelled on April 2 after the FIA rejected Champ Car's replacement date.
The Grand Prix Arizona was cancelled on August 29.

Race results

Final driver standings

Driver breakdown

Rule changes
The new rules of the 2007 season included the implementation of standing starts at venues where they could be safely implemented. Additionally, all events were timed events instead of running a set number of laps. As the time limit approaches, the drivers were notified that they were beginning the last lap. The leader would NOT be shown the white flag, which was instead employed in a similar manner to its use by the FIA. Teams were also allowed unlimited access to their tires during all qualifying sessions. The requirement for each team to use at least one set of the alternate Bridgestone Potenzas during the race would remain in place.

Starting this season drivers no longer received a bonus point for leading a lap of the race.

Notes

References

See also
 2007 Champ Car Atlantic season
 2007 Indianapolis 500
 2007 IndyCar Series
 2007 Indy Pro Series season

Champ Car seasons
Champ Car
2007 in Champ Car
Champ Car World Series